Geoff Pevere (born October 1957) is a Canadian lecturer, author, broadcaster, teacher, arts and media critic, currently the program director of the Rendezvous With Madness Film Festival in Toronto. He is a former film critic, book columnist and cultural journalist for the Toronto Star, where he worked from 1998 to 2011. His writing has appeared in several newspapers, magazines and arts journals, and he has worked as a broadcaster for both radio and television. He has lectured widely on cultural and media topics, and taught courses at several Canadian universities and colleges. In 2012, he contributed weekly pop culture columns to CBC Radio Syndication, which were heard in nearly twenty markets across Canada. He has also been a movie columnist and regular freelance contributor with The Globe and Mail.

Early life

Born in Ottawa, Ontario, Pevere grew up in a variety of locations including London and St. Catharines. He graduated in 1982 from the film studies program at Carleton University, where he was also a writer for the student newspaper The Charlatan and a contributor to CKCU-FM. He was subsequently a film reviewer for the city's CHEZ-FM.

In 1986 he was named the first program coordinator of the Toronto International Film Festival's Perspective Canada program, which introduced the work of Atom Egoyan, Bruce McDonald and Guy Maddin, among others, during his tenure.

Broadcasting
From 1986 to 1988 he contributed to CBC Radio's State of the Arts program, and in 1988 started a twelve-year stint as the movie reviewer on CTV's Canada AM.

From 1989 to 1993, Pevere hosted Prime Time, a groundbreaking nightly pop culture magazine series on CBC Radio. In 1993, after the death of Jay Scott, he was the host of Film International on TVOntario.

From 2003 to 2008 he was the co-host, with Richard Crouse, of Rogers Television's Reel to Real.

Writing
He co-wrote the book Mondo Canuck (1996), a bestselling critical evaluation of Canadian pop culture. He is also the author of Team Spirit: A Field Guide to Roots Culture (1998), Toronto on Film (2009) and Donald Shebib's Goin' Down the Road (2012). In 2014, he published Gods of the Hammer: The Teenage Head Story, a history of the influential Canadian punk rock band Teenage Head, for Coach House Books.

In 2012, he launched a network of encyclopedic critical pop cultural websites called "The Blessed Diversions Network". "Mean Justice" is devoted to western movies and TV shows; "The Big Shadow" is dedicated to the movie and TV culture of crime; "Riff Free or Die" covers the visual history of rock music; and "The Directory of Intemperate Enthusiasms" covers cult movies and TV.

Rendezvous with Madness
November 2015 saw Pevere's first stint as program director of the Rendezvous With Madness Film Festival, an annual event dedicated to showcasing the best in current cinema addressing issues of mental health, addiction and recovery.

References

External links
 

Canadian columnists
Canadian television hosts
Canadian film critics
Canadian literary critics
CBC Radio hosts
Canadian male non-fiction writers
Living people
1957 births
Writers from Ottawa
Carleton University alumni